Short rib–polydactyly syndrome is a family of four closely related dysplasias:
 I – "Saldino-Noonan type"
 II – "Majewski type"
 III – "Verma-Naumoff type" (associated with DYNC2H1)
 IV – "Beemer-Langer type"

References

External links 

Growth disorders
Syndromes